Rosaria Console, better known as Rosalba (born 17 December 1979 in Martina Franca, Taranto) is an Italian long-distance runner who specializes in the half marathon and marathon.

Biography
She won four medals, one of these at junior level, at the International athletics competitions. She participated at two editions of the Summer Olympics (2004, 2012). She has 14 caps in national team from 1994 to 2012. She suffered a tibia problem in early 2011 but still managed to take fifth place at the Rome City Marathon in March. She won seven national championships (two on 10000 m in 2008 and 2016, four on half-marathon in 2003, 2009, 2010 and 2016, one on marathon in 2008).

Achievements

National titles
She has won the individual national championship 8 times.
3 wins in 10,000 metres (2008, 2016, 2018)
4 wins in half marathon (2003, 2009, 2010, 2016)
1 win in marathon (2008)

See also
Italian all-time top lists - Half marathon
Italian all-time top lists - Marathon

References

External links
 

1979 births
Living people
Italian female long-distance runners
Italian female marathon runners
Athletics competitors of Fiamme Gialle
Athletes (track and field) at the 2004 Summer Olympics
Athletes (track and field) at the 2012 Summer Olympics
Olympic athletes of Italy
Universiade medalists in athletics (track and field)
Sportspeople from Taranto
World Athletics Championships athletes for Italy
Mediterranean Games silver medalists for Italy
Mediterranean Games medalists in athletics
Athletes (track and field) at the 2005 Mediterranean Games
Athletes (track and field) at the 2009 Mediterranean Games
Universiade gold medalists for Italy
Medalists at the 1999 Summer Universiade
20th-century Italian women
21st-century Italian women